The 69th Air Defense Artillery Brigade is an air defense artillery brigade of the United States Army.

Subordinate units include:
 4th Battalion, 5th Air Defense Artillery.
 1st Battalion, 44th Air Defense Artillery
 1st Battalion, 62nd Air Defense Artillery

History
Organized 17 May 1918 in the Regular Army at Fort Worden, Washington as the 69th Artillery (Coast Artillery Corps)

Demobilized 5 March 1919 at Camp Eustis, Virginia

Reconstituted 16 October 1936 in the Regular Army; concurrently consolidated with the 69th Coast Artillery (constituted 22 January 1926 in the Regular Army and activated 1 February 1930 at Aberdeen Proving Ground, Maryland), and consolidated unit designated as the 69th Coast Artillery

The regiment was broken up on 10 September 1943 and its elements reorganized and redesignated as follows:

Headquarters and Headquarters Battery as Headquarters and Headquarters Battery, 69th Antiaircraft Artillery Group

(1st Battalion as the 69th Antiaircraft Artillery Gun Battalion; 2d Battalion as the 529th Antiaircraft Artillery Automatic Weapons Battalion; 3d Battalion as the 249th Antiaircraft Artillery Searchlight Battalion – hereafter separate lineages)

Headquarters and Headquarters Battery, 69th Antiaircraft Artillery Group, inactivated 5 June 1948 on Saipan

Activated 1 July 1955 in Germany

Inactivated 1 November 1957 in Germany

Redesignated 1 April 1960 as Headquarters and Headquarters Battery, 69th Artillery Group, and activated in Germany. HHB at Emery Barracks, Würzburg, Germany.

Redesignated 15 March 1972 as Headquarters and Headquarters Battery, 69th Air Defense Artillery Group

Reorganized and redesignated 16 July 1983 as Headquarters and Headquarters Battery, 69th Air Defense Artillery Brigade

Brigade personnel deployed to Israel during Operation Desert Fox in 1998

See also
 Air Defense Artillery Branch (United States)
 U.S. Army Coast Artillery Corps

References
 http://www.hood.army.mil/69ada/history_files/Lineage%20and%20Insignia.pdf
 https://history.army.mil/html/forcestruc/lineages/branches/ada/0069adabde.htm

External links
 http://www.hood.army.mil/69ADA/
 https://web.archive.org/web/20120614104048/http://www.tioh.hqda.pentagon.mil/Heraldry/ArmyDUISSICOA/ArmyHeraldryUnit.aspx?u=2863
 http://freepages.military.rootsweb.ancestry.com/~cacunithistories/69th_Artillery.html

069
 Military units and formations established in 2008